The 2016 United States House of Representatives elections in Maryland were held on November 8, 2016, to elect the eight U.S. representatives from the state of Maryland, one from each of the state's eight congressional districts. The elections coincided with the 2016 U.S. presidential election, as well as other elections to the House of Representatives, elections to the United States Senate and various state and local elections. The primaries were held on April 26.

Overview

District 1

The 1st district includes the entire Eastern Shore of Maryland as well as parts of Baltimore, Harford and Carroll counties. The incumbent was Republican Andy Harris, who had represented the district since 2011. He was re-elected with 70% of the vote in 2014 and the district had a PVI of R+14.

Harris had considered a run for the U.S. Senate, but chose to seek reelection.

Republican primary

Candidates
Declared
 Jonathan Goff
 Andy Harris, incumbent U.S. Representative
 Sean Jackson
 Michael D. Smigiel Sr., former State Delegate

Declined
 J. B. Jennings, state senator
 Kathy Szeliga, state delegate (running for the U.S. Senate)

Primary results

Democratic primary

Candidates
Declared
 Jim Ireton, Salisbury City Councilman and former Mayor of Salisbury
 Joe Werner, attorney

Primary results

Libertarian Party
 Matt Beers

General election

Results

District 2

The 2nd district includes parts of Howard, Harford, Baltimore and Anne Arundel counties, as well as small portions of the City of Baltimore. The incumbent is Democrat Dutch Ruppersberger, who has represented the district since 2003. He was re-elected with 61% of the vote in 2014 and the district has a PVI of D+10.

Ruppersberger considered running for the U.S. Senate, but chose to seek reelection.

Democratic primary

Candidates
Declared
 Dutch Ruppersberger, incumbent U.S. Representative

Primary results

Republican primary

Candidates
Declared
 Bill Heine, project management specialist and candidate for the Anne Arundel County Council in 2014
 Carl Magee
 Pat McDonough, state delegate
 Yuripzy Morgan, attorney
 Mark Shell

Primary results

Libertarian Party
 Kristin Kasprzak

General election

Results

District 3

The 3rd district includes parts of Baltimore, Howard, Montgomery and Anne Arundel counties, as well as a significant part of the City of Baltimore. The incumbent is Democrat John Sarbanes, who has represented the district since 2007. He was re-elected with 60% of the vote in 2014 and the district has a PVI of D+9.

Sarbanes considered running for the U.S. Senate, but decided to run for re-election instead. 2014 primary challenger Matthew Molyett had filed to run again, but withdrew.

Democratic primary

Candidates
Declared
 John Rea
 John Sarbanes, incumbent U.S. Representative

Withdrew
 Matthew Molyett

Primary results

Republican primary

Candidates
Declared
 Thomas Harris, perennial candidate
 Mark Plaster, physician

Primary results

Green Party
 Nnabu Eze

General election

Results

District 4

The 4th district includes parts of Prince George's, and Anne Arundel counties. The incumbent is Democrat Donna Edwards, who has represented the district since 2008. She was re-elected with 70% of the vote in 2014 and the district has a PVI of D+26. Edwards did not run for reelection, so that she could run for the United States Senate seat being vacated by Barbara Mikulski, who is retiring. On April 26, 2016, Edwards lost the primary to Chris Van Hollen.

Democratic primary

Candidates
Declared
 Anthony Brown, former lieutenant governor and nominee for governor in 2014
 Warren Christopher, retired United States Army lieutenant colonel and candidate for this seat in 2014
 Matthew Fogg, retired Chief Deputy U.S. Marshal and anti-racism and anti-corruption activist
 Glenn Ivey, former Prince George's County State Attorney and candidate for this seat in 2012
 Joseline Peña-Melnyk, state delegate
 Terence Strait

Withdrew
 Dereck E. Davis, state delegate
 Lisa Ransom, political strategist and 2010 State Delegate candidate
 Alvin Thornton, former chair of the political science department at Howard University and chair of the Commission on Education Finance, Equity and Excellence
 Ingrid Turner, Prince George's County Councilmember

Declined
 Angela Alsobrooks, Prince George's County State's Attorney
 Rushern Baker, Prince George's County Executive
 Erek Barron, state delegate
 Jamie Benoit, Anne Arundel County councilman
 Aisha N. Braveboy, former state delegate and candidate for state Attorney General in 2014
 Delman Coates, pastor and candidate for lieutenant governor in 2014
 Derrick Davis, Prince George's County Councilmember
 Donna Edwards, incumbent U.S. Representative (running for U.S. Senate)
 Andrea Harrison, Prince George's County Councilmember
 Jolene Ivey, former state delegate and candidate for Lieutenant Governor in 2014
 Michael A. Jackson, state delegate and former Prince George's County Sheriff
 C. Anthony Muse, state senator and candidate for the U.S. Senate in 2012
 Victor R. Ramirez, state senator
 Kris Valderrama, state delegate
 Michael L. Vaughn, state delegate
 Jay Walker, state delegate

Endorsements

Primary results

Republican primary

Candidates
Declared
 Robert Broadus, candidate for the U.S. Senate in 2012
 Rob Buck
 George McDermott, perennial candidate
 David Therrien

Primary results

Green Party
 Kamesha Clark

General election

Results

District 5

The 5th district includes all of Charles, St. Mary's, and Calvert counties, as well as portions of Prince George's and Anne Arundel counties. The incumbent is Democrat Steny Hoyer, the House Minority Whip, who has represented the district since 1981. He was re-elected with 64% of the vote in 2014 and the district has a PVI of D+14.

Democratic primary

Candidates
Declared
 Kristin Beck, former United States Navy SEAL
 Steny Hoyer, incumbent U.S. Representative
 Debbie Wilson

Primary results

Republican primary

Candidates
Declared
 Mark Arness, physician and candidate for this seat in 2014
 Charles Sam Faddis, retired CIA officer

Primary results

General election

Results

District 6

The 6th district includes the entire Maryland Panhandle including all of Garrett, Allegany and Washington counties as well as portions of Montgomery and Frederick counties. The incumbent is Democrat John Delaney, who has represented the district since 2013. He was re-elected with 50% of the vote in 2014 and the district has a PVI of D+4.

Delaney considered running for the U.S. Senate, but chose to seek reelection.

Democratic primary

Candidates
Declared
 John Delaney, incumbent U.S. Representative
 Tony Puca

Declined
 Kumar Barve, state delegate and former majority leader of the Maryland House of Delegates (running for MD-08)
 John P. Donoghue, former state delegate
 Brian Feldman, state senator
 William Frick, state delegate
 Rob Garagiola, former state senator and candidate for this seat in 2012
 Roger Manno, state senator
 Kirill Reznik, state delegate
 Craig L. Rice, Montgomery County Councilman
 Mark Shriver, former state delegate and candidate for MD-08 in 2002

Primary results

Republican primary

Candidates
Declared
 Terry Baker, president of the Washington County Board of County Commissioners
 Scott Cheng, physician, college instructor, and 2014 State House candidate
 Robin Ficker, former state delegate, candidate for U.S. Senate in 2000, and candidate for this seat in 2012
 Amie Hoeber, businesswoman and former Deputy Under Secretary of the Army
 Frank Howard, businessman and 2014 state senate candidate
 Christopher Mason, carpenter and 2014 Frederick County Council candidate
 Harold Painter, certified public accountant and candidate for this seat in 2014
 David E. Vogt, State Delegate

Declined
 Kathy Afzali, state delegate and candidate for this seat in 2012
 Augustus Alzona, tax consultant, candidate for Comptroller of Maryland in 2002, and candidate for MD-08 in 2012
 Dan Bongino, former United States Secret Service agent, candidate for U.S. Senate in 2012 and nominee for this seat in 2014 (moved to Florida)
 Thomas Ferleman, business management consultant
 Mike McKay, state delegate
 Neil Parrott, state delegate

Endorsements

Primary results

Green Party
 George Gluck

Polling

General election

Results

District 7

The 7th district includes just over half of the City of Baltimore, most of the majority African American sections of Baltimore County, and the majority of Howard County, Maryland. The incumbent is Democrat Elijah Cummings, who has represented the district since 1996. He was re-elected with 70% of the vote in 2014 and the district has a PVI of D+24.

Cummings considered running for the U.S. Senate, but chose to seek reelection.

Democratic primary

Candidates
Declared
 Elijah Cummings, incumbent U.S. Representative
 Adrian Petrus

Withdrawn
 Jamal Bryant

Declined
 Calvin Ball, Howard County Councilman
 Talmadge Branch, state delegate
 Lisa Gladden, state senator

Primary results

Republican primary

Candidates
Declared
 Ray Bly, perennial candidate
 Wayne T. Newton
 Corrogan Vaughn, perennial candidate

Primary results

Libertarian Party
 Scott Soffen

Green Party
 Myles Hoenig

Independents
 Andre Odell Kersey

General election

Results

District 8

The 8th district includes parts of Carroll, Frederick and Montgomery counties. The incumbent is Democrat Chris Van Hollen, who has represented the district since 2003. He was re-elected with 61% of the vote in 2014 and the district has a PVI of D+11.

Van Hollen did not run for reelection, so that he could run for the United States Senate seat being vacated by Barbara Mikulski, who was retiring.

Democratic primary

Candidates
Declared
 David M. Anderson, senior vice president at the Washington Center and adjunct faculty member at Johns Hopkins University
 Kumar Barve, state delegate and former majority leader of the Maryland House of Delegates
 Dan Bolling
 Ana Sol Gutierrez, state delegate
 Will Jawando, former Congressional and White House aide and 2014 State Delegate candidate
 Kathleen Matthews, Marriott International executive and former news anchor
 Jamie Raskin, state senator
 Joel Rubin, former State Department official and founding political and government affairs director at J Street
 David Trone, founder and president of Total Wine & More

Withdrawn
 Valerie Ervin, former Montgomery County Councilwoman

Declined
 Roger Berliner, Montgomery County Councilman
 William A. Bronrott, former state delegate and former Deputy Administrator of the Federal Motor Carrier Safety Administration
 Doug Duncan, former Montgomery County Executive
 Nancy Floreen, Montgomery City Councilwoman
 Peter Franchot, State Comptroller
 Jan Gardner, Frederick County Executive
 William Frick, state delegate
 Cheryl Kagan, state senator
 Ariana Kelly, state delegate
 Susan C. Lee, state senator
 George Leventhal, Montgomery County Councilman
 Rich Madaleno, state senator
 Tom Manatos, former Congressional staffer
 Roger Manno, state senator
 Heather Mizeur, former state delegate and candidate for Governor in 2014
 Nancy Navarro, Montgomery County Councilwoman
 Josh Rales, businessman and candidate for U.S. Senate in 2006
 Oscar Ramirez, former Vice Chair of the Maryland Democratic Party
 Craig L. Rice, Montgomery County Councilman
 Hans Riemer, Montgomery County Councilman
 Luiz R. S. Simmons, state delegate
 Susan Turnbull, former chair of the Maryland Democratic Party
 Chris Van Hollen, incumbent U.S. Representative (running for U.S. Senate)
 Jeff Waldstreicher, state delegate

Endorsements

Primary results

Republican primary

Candidates
Declared
 Dan Cox, former aide to Alan Keyes
 Jeffrey W. Jones
 Liz Matory, business consultant and Democratic candidate for State Delegate in 2014
 Aryeh Shudofsky
 Shelly Skolnick

Declined
 Augustus Alzona, tax consultant, candidate for Comptroller of Maryland in 2002, and candidate for MD-08 in 2012
 James Calderwood, attorney, chair of the Maryland Transportation Commission and founding director of the Maryland Public Policy Institute
 Bill Day, attorney
 Frank Howard, businessman and 2014 State Senate candidate (running for district 6 instead)

Primary results

Green Party
 Nancy Wallace

Primary results

Independents

Withdrawn
 Liz Matory, business consultant and Democratic candidate for State Delegate in 2014 (running as a Republican)

General election

Results

References

External links
U.S. House elections in Maryland, 2016 at Ballotpedia
Campaign contributions at OpenSecrets

Maryland
2016
United States House